Vivo Italian Kitchen is a restaurant located in Universal Orlando Resort's CityWalk and Universal Studios Hollywood's CityWalk. It is an Italian restaurant located next to the NBC Sports Grill & Brew Restaurant and in front of The Cowfish Restaurant in Orlando and next to Sephora in Hollywood. Vivo serves moderately priced traditional Italian food and has an array of wines and beers to choose from. The restaurant opened in 2015 in Orlando and in 2018 in Hollywood.

References

Restaurants in Orlando, Florida
Universal Orlando
Italian restaurants in the United States